Paraparaumu Beach is a coastal settlement on the Kapiti Coast of New Zealand's North Island. It is located west of the main Paraparaumu township, 50 km north of Wellington. The area faces Kapiti Island.

Demographics

There were 3,609 households. There were 4,293 males and 4,794 females, giving a sex ratio of 0.9 males per female, with 1,629 people (17.9%) aged under 15 years, 1,287 (14.2%) aged 15 to 29, 3,921 (43.1%) aged 30 to 64, and 2,250 (24.8%) aged 65 or older.

Ethnicities were 89.9% European/Pākehā, 11.8% Māori, 2.7% Pacific peoples, 4.5% Asian, and 2.5% other ethnicities (totals add to more than 100% since people could identify with multiple ethnicities).

The proportion of people born overseas was 23.4%, compared with 27.1% nationally.

Although some people objected to giving their religion, 53.7% had no religion, 35.5% were Christian, 0.6% were Hindu, 0.2% were Muslim, 0.5% were Buddhist and 1.9% had other religions.

Of those at least 15 years old, 1,491 (20.0%) people had a bachelor or higher, and 1,230 (16.5%) people had no formal qualifications. The employment status of those at least 15 was that 3,270 (43.8%) people were employed full-time, 1,059 (14.2%) were part-time, and 303 (4.1%) were unemployed.

The demographics for Paraparaumu Beach are also incorporated in Paraparaumu#Demographics.

Attractions
Attractions include a studio and gallery of artist Shona Moller and Paraparaumu Beach Golf Club, as well as newly refurbished MacLean Park area, the Saturday Market on MacLean Street, the shops around the area, and the Kapiti Boating Club.

Education

References

Beaches of the Wellington Region
Populated places in the Wellington Region
Kapiti Coast District
Paraparaumu